The Etobicoke General Hospital is a community hospital located at 101 Humber College Boulevard in the Etobicoke district of Toronto, Ontario, Canada. Etobicoke General Hospital serves the communities of Etobicoke, Brampton, Mississauga, Caledon, and Woodbridge.

Overview
The hospital has 262 hospital beds and serves over 230 000 residents in Etobicoke and the surrounding areas. Annually, the hospital has over 50,270 outpatients, 15,785 inpatients, and has 70,000 emergency visits. It employs 1026 health care professionals, and has more than 200 affiliated family physicians and specialists. It also has 400 dedicated volunteers including a wide variety of co-operative education students. It is a member of the William Osler Health System group of hospitals.

History 
The original hospital building was opened in 1972, following governmental investment and a major donations push led by a group of local volunteers. Although rearrangement and renovation followed over the decades since the hospital's opening, further expansion would occur more than 40 years later.

In 2018, Osler opened the Etobicoke Wellness Centre (EWC). The Wellness Centre represents a partnership between the hospital and various external partners, such as independent physicians and private businesses. It houses a number of Etobicoke General outpatient services, such as a fracture clinic, a pre-anesthesia care unit, diagnostic imaging, a diabetes education centre, and a 15-machine hemodialysis unit, newly opened in April 2020. The remainder of the building is dedicated to private clinics and businesses, such as LifeLabs.

Immediately following the opening of the Etobicoke Wellness Centre, a new patient tower (nicknamed the "west wing") was opened in June 2019. The patient tower houses a new emergency department, ICU, birthing unit, neonatal ICU, and a number of outpatient clinics.

Notes

Hospital buildings completed in 1972
Hospitals in Toronto
Hospitals established in 1972
Etobicoke
1972 establishments in Ontario